Constance Whitney Warren (January 17, 1888 – October 11, 1948) was an American sculptor.

Early life
Warren was born in New York City on January 17, 1888 to George Henry Warren II (1855–1943) and Georgia "Daisy" Williams (1863–1937).  Her parents had a townhouse in New York and a large cottage in Newport, Rhode Island.

Warren's maternal grandparents were George Henry Warren (one of the founders of the Metropolitan Opera) and Mary Caroline (née Phoenix) Warren (a daughter of U.S. Representative Jonas P. Phoenix and granddaughter of Stephen Whitney, one of the wealthiest merchants in New York City). Among her extended family were uncles Whitney Warren and Lloyd Warren, prominent architects, and cousins Robert Walton Goelet (a financier and real estate developer) and Edith Starr Miller (an author who married Almeric Paget, 1st Baron Queenborough).

Career

During World War I, Warren chauffeured English staff officers.

After the war, Warren became a prominent sculptor and, a few years later, she exhibited at the Paris Salon and her reputation spread to the United States. Today she is known for various sculptures, including the 1921–25 Texas Cowboy Monument at the Texas State Capitol in Austin, Texas, the 1926–29 Tribute to Range Riders at the Oklahoma State Capitol in Oklahoma City, Oklahoma, and the 1924 Lariat Cowboy in Phoenix, Arizona.

Personal life
On December 19, 1912, Warren married Count Guy de Lasteyrie at St. Patrick's Cathedral, New York. He was the eldest son of the Marquis de Lasteyrie and the former Olivia Elizabeth Goodlake. Count Guy was a direct descendant, a great-great grandson, of the French aristocrat and American Revolutionary War hero Gilbert du Motier, marquis de Lafayette.  They divorced in the early 1920s before his father's death in 1923, when he became the marquis de Lasteyrie du Saillant.

After her marriage in 1912, Warren lived in Paris and at a chateau in the French countryside. Sadly, in November 1930, "she was committed to an institution for the insane, remaining there until her death eighteen years later on October 11, 1948, in Beacon, New York." She was buried at Evergreen Cemetery in Stonington, Connecticut.

References

External links

1888 births
1948 deaths
20th-century American women artists
20th-century American sculptors
French countesses
Artists from New York City
Sculptors from New York (state)